Georgia's 88th House District elects one member of the Georgia House of Representatives. 
Its current representative is Democrat Billy Mitchell.

References 

Georgia House of Representatives districts
Political history of Georgia (U.S. state)
Politics of Georgia (U.S. state)